The St. Joseph Metropolitan Statistical Area, as defined by the United States Census Bureau, is an area consisting of four counties - three in northwest Missouri (Andrew, Buchanan, and DeKalb) and one in northeast Kansas (Doniphan) - anchored by the city of St. Joseph, comprising a total area of . As of the 2020 census, the MSA had a population of 121,467.

Counties
Andrew County, Missouri
Buchanan County, Missouri
DeKalb County, Missouri
Doniphan County, Kansas

Communities

Places with more than 70,000 inhabitants
St. Joseph, Missouri (Principal city) Pop: 76,780

Places with 1,000 to 10,000 inhabitants
Cameron, Missouri (partial) Pop: 9,933
Savannah, Missouri Pop: 5,057
Country Club, Missouri Pop: 2,449
Gower, Missouri (partial) Pop: 1,526
Wathena, Kansas Pop: 1,364
Elwood, Kansas Pop: 1,224
Maysville, Missouri Pop: 1,114
Highland, Kansas Pop: 1,012

Places with fewer than 999 inhabitants
Troy, Kansas Pop: 964
Stewartsville, Missouri Pop: 750
Agency, Missouri Pop: 684
Dearborn, Missouri (partial) Pop: 496
Union Star, Missouri Pop: 437
Osborn, Missouri (partial) Pop: 423
Amazonia, Missouri Pop: 312
Rushville, Missouri Pop: 303
Clarksdale, Missouri Pop: 271
Easton, Missouri Pop: 234
De Kalb, Missouri Pop: 220
Bolckow, Missouri Pop: 187
Fillmore, Missouri Pop: 184
White Cloud, Kansas Pop: 176
Denton, Kansas Pop: 148
Rosendale, Missouri Pop: 143
Lewis and Clark Village, Missouri Pop: 132
Cosby, Missouri Pop: 124
Weatherby, Missouri Pop: 107
Severance, Kansas Pop: 94
Amity, Missouri  Pop: 54
Rea, Missouri Pop: 50
Leona, Kansas Pop: 48

Unincorporated places
Bendena, Kansas
Doniphan, Kansas
Fairport, Missouri
Faucett, Missouri
Helena, Missouri
Wallace, Missouri

Demographics
As of the census of 2000, there were 122,336 people, 46,531 households, and 31,203 families residing within the MSA. The racial makeup of the MSA was 93.29% White, 4.10% African American, 0.49% Native American, 0.38% Asian, 0.02% Pacific Islander, 0.53% from other races, and 1.20% from two or more races. Hispanic or Latino of any race were 2.00% of the population.

The median income for a household in the MSA was $34,896, and the median income for a family was $41,290. Males had a median income of $30,296 versus $21,085 for females. The per capita income for the MSA was $16,198.

See also
Missouri census statistical areas
Kansas census statistical areas
List of cities in Missouri
List of villages in Missouri
List of cities in Kansas

References

 
Metropolitan areas of Missouri